Cham Zhiyeh (also Romanized as Cham Zhīyeh; also known as Chamzheh) is a village in Arkavazi Rural District, Chavar District, Ilam County, Ilam Province, Iran. At the 2006 census, its population was 75, in 13 families. The village is populated by Kurds.

References 

Populated places in Ilam County
Kurdish settlements in Ilam Province